Netball is promoted in Malaysia at the Sport Carnival for All (KESUMA). In 1998, 113 districts held netball competitions. That year, there were 1,718 registered netball teams in the country. In 2001, netball was sufficiently popular in South East Asia for it to be included in the 21st Southeast Asian Games in Kuala Lumpur. Malaysia had a national team compete in the fifth Asian Netball Championships in Colombo in 2001. Malaysia also competed in the 7th Asian Youth Netball Championship in India in 2010. Petronas, the national oil company, has been a major sponsor of netball in the country.  This type of sponsorship was encouraged by the government as part of the Rakan Sukan programme.

Important netball competitions held in Malaysia include:
 The 1998 Commonwealth Games

The top performances for the Malaysia national netball team include:
 2010 Asian Youth Netball Championship: First

As of August 2016, the women's national team was ranked number nineteenth in the world.

References

Bibliography

External links 
Olympic Council of Asia